Allium chitralicum is a plant species found in the Himalayas of Afghanistan, Tajikistan and Pakistan. It has an egg-shaped bulb up to 15 mm long, narrow leaves, and rose-colored flowers.

References

chitralicum
Onions
Flora of Afghanistan
Flora of Tajikistan
Flora of Pakistan
Plants described in 1937